Madhurikkunna Raathri is a 1978 Indian Malayalam-language film,  directed by P. G. Vishwambharan. The film stars Ravikumar, Vincent, Aparna and Mala Aravindan. The film has musical score by M. S. Viswanathan.

Cast
Ravikumar
Vincent
Thikkurissy Sukumaran Nair
P. K. Abraham
Pattom Sadan
Mala Aravindan
Mamatha
Aparna
Meena

Soundtrack
The music was composed by M. S. Viswanathan and the lyrics were written by Yusufali Kechery.

References

External links
 

1978 films
1970s Malayalam-language films
Films scored by M. S. Viswanathan
Films directed by P. G. Viswambharan